Williamsburg Memorial Park is a 41-acre, non-profit, multi-denominational cemetery located at 130 King William Drive in Williamsburg, Virginia, United States. It was established in 1962 and built on the historic plantation of Benjamin Stoddert Ewell.

Notable interments 
 Adelaida Avagyan (1924–2000), Armenian physician, researcher, and healthcare leader
 Bud Davis (1895–1967), American baseball player
 Eric Tipton (1915–2001), American baseball player

Gallery

References

External links 
 Williamsburg Memorial Park Official Website

Cemeteries in Williamsburg, Virginia
1962 establishments in Virginia